Omniscience is the capacity to know everything. In Hinduism, Sikhism and the Abrahamic religions, this is an attribute of God. In Jainism, omniscience is an attribute that any individual can eventually attain. In Buddhism, there are differing beliefs about omniscience among different schools.

Etymology 
The word omniscience derives from the Latin word sciens ("to know" or "conscious") and the prefix omni ("all" or "every"), but also means "all-seeing".

In religion

Buddhism

The topic of omniscience has been much debated in various Indian traditions, but no more so than by the Buddhists. After Dharmakirti's excursions into the subject of what constitutes a valid cognition, Śāntarakṣita and his student Kamalaśīla thoroughly investigated the subject in the Tattvasamgraha and its commentary the Panjika. The arguments in the text can be broadly grouped into four sections:
 The refutation that cognitions, either perceived, inferred, or otherwise, can be used to refute omniscience.
 A demonstration of the possibility of omniscience through apprehending the selfless universal nature of all knowables, by examining what it means to be ignorant and the nature of mind and awareness.
 A demonstration of the total omniscience where all individual characteristics (svalaksana) are available to the omniscient being.
 The specific demonstration of Shakyamuni Buddha's non-exclusive omniscience.

Christianity

Some modern Christian theologians argue that God's omniscience is inherent rather than total, and that God chooses to limit his omniscience in order to preserve the free will and dignity of his creatures. John Calvin, among other theologians of the 16th century, comfortable with the definition of God as being omniscient in the total sense, in order for worthy beings' abilities to choose freely, embraced the doctrine of predestination.

Hinduism
In the Bhakti tradition of Vaishnavism, where Vishnu is worshipped as the supreme God,  Vishnu is attributed with numerous qualities such as omniscience, energy, strength, lordship, vigour, and splendour.

Islam
In Islam, God (Allah) is attributed with absolute omniscience. God knows the past, the present, and the future. It is compulsory for a Muslim to believe that God is indeed omniscient as stated in one of the six articles of faith which is:
 To believe that God’s divine decree and predestination

It is believed that humans can only change their predestination (wealth, health, deed etc.) and not divine decree (date of birth, date of death, family etc.), thus allowing free will.

Jainism

In Jainism, omniscience is considered the highest type of perception. In the words of a Jain scholar, "The perfect manifestation of the innate nature of the self, arising on the complete annihilation of the obstructive veils, is called omniscience."

Jainism views infinite knowledge as an inherent capability of every soul. Arihanta is the word used by Jains to refer to those human beings who have conquered all inner passions (like attachment, greed, pride, anger) and possess Kevala Jnana (infinite knowledge). They are said to be of two kinds:
 Sāmānya kevali – omniscient beings (Kevalins) who are concerned with their own liberation.
 Tirthankara kevali – human beings who attain omniscience and then help others to achieve the same.

Omniscience and free will

Whether omniscience, particularly regarding the choices that a human will make, is compatible with free will has been debated by theologians and philosophers. The argument that divine foreknowledge is not compatible with free will is known as theological fatalism. It is argued that if humans are free to choose between alternatives, God could not know what this choice will be.

A question arises: if an omniscient entity knows everything, even about its own decisions in the future, does it therefore forbid any free will to that entity? William Lane Craig states that the question subdivides into two:
 If God foreknows the occurrence of some event E, does E happen necessarily?
 If some event E is contingent, how can God foreknow E’s occurrence?

However, this kind of argument fails to recognize its use of the modal fallacy. It is possible to show that the first premise of arguments like these is fallacious.

Omniscience and the privacy of conscious experience
Some philosophers, such as Patrick Grim, Linda Zagzebski, Stephan Torre, and William Mander have discussed the issue of whether the apparent exclusively first-person nature of conscious experience is compatible with God's omniscience. There is a strong sense in which conscious experience is private, meaning that no outside observer can gain knowledge of what it is like to be me as me. If a subject cannot know what it is like to be another subject in an objective manner, the question is whether that limitation applies to God as well. If it does, then God cannot be said to be omniscient since there is then a form of knowledge that God lacks access to.

The philosopher Patrick Grim most notably raised this issue. Linda Zagzebski argued against this by introducing the notion of perfect empathy, a proposed relation that God can have to subjects that would allow God to have perfect knowledge of their conscious experience. William Mander argued that God can only have such knowledge if our experiences are part of God's broader experience. Stephan Torre claimed that God can have such knowledge if self-knowledge involves the ascription of properties, either to oneself or to others.

See also
 Epistemology
 Omnibenevolence
 Omniscient point-of-view, in writing, is to know everything that can be known about a character.
 Omnipotence
 Omnipresence
 Pantomath
 Self-awareness

References

Sources

External links
 
 Omniscience and Divine Foreknowledge article in the Internet Encyclopedia of Philosophy
 Is God All-Knowing?

Conceptions of God
Superlatives in religion
Knowledge